Sungai Buaya is a small town in Hulu Selangor District, Selangor, Malaysia.

Transportation

Car
North–South Expressway Northern Route, 117 serves Sungai Buaya.

References

Hulu Selangor District
Towns in Selangor